The following is a list of rugby league competitions that are still currently in existence. This includes both international tournaments played by national Test teams and also domestic club and provincial competitions. Throughout the list bold indicates the league is a professional or semi-professional competition.

International tournaments

Global

Continental

Regional

Challenge Matches

Domestic Leagues

Europe

 Great Britain

Australia and Pacific

Africa

Asia and the Middle East

The Americas

Domestic Cups

/ Great Britain

 Great Britain

Women's Rugby League

International tournaments

International

Continental

Domestic Leagues

 Great Britain

Domestic Cups

 Great Britain

Wheelchair Rugby League

International tournaments

International

Continental

Domestic Leagues

 Great Britain

Domestic Cups

 Great Britain

Nines tournaments

International 

  Rugby League World Cup 9s

Australia 

 / NRL Nines

See also

Geography of rugby league

Notes

References

External links

Competitions
 
Rugby league